Patricia Reid Lindner was a Republican member of the Illinois House of Representatives, representing the 50th district from 1993 until her retirement at the end of her term in 2009.  Lindner served on seven committees: Child Support Enforcement, Judiciary II- Criminal Law, Appropriations-Elementary and Secondary Education, Government Accountability and Streamlining, Adoption Reform, and the subcommittee on Methamphetamine.

She is the daughter of Charlotte Thompson Reid who served as a U.S. Representative for Illinois from 1962 to 1971.

External links
Illinois General Assembly - Representative Patricia Reid Lindner (R) 50th District official IL House website
Bills Committees
Project Vote Smart - Representative Patricia Reid Lindner (IL) profile
Follow the Money - Patricia Reid Lindner
2006 2004 2002 2000 1998 1996 campaign contributions

Republican Party members of the Illinois House of Representatives
Women state legislators in Illinois
1939 births
Living people
People from Aurora, Illinois
21st-century American politicians
21st-century American women politicians